Colina macrostoma is a species of sea snail, a marine gastropod mollusc in the family Cerithiidae.

Description

Distribution

References

Cerithiidae
Gastropods described in 1844